Seiffert's spherical spiral is a curve on a sphere made by moving on the sphere with constant speed and angular velocity with respect to a fixed diameter.  If the selected diameter is the line from the north pole to the south pole, then the requirement of constant angular velocity means that the longitude of the moving point changes at a constant rate. The cylindrical coordinates of the varying point on this curve are given by the Jacobian elliptic functions.

Formulation

Symbols

Representation via equations 
The Seiffert's spherical spiral can be expressed as

or expressed as Jacobi theta functions

.

See also
 Rhumb line

References

External links

Spirals
Spherical curves